Renzo Merlin (27 September 1923 – 5 November 2003) was an Italian professional football player. 

He played for 5 seasons (108 games, 32 goals) in the Serie A for Salernitana Calcio 1919, A.S. Lucchese Libertas 1905 and A.S. Roma.

Merlin died in November 2003 at the age of 80.

References

External links
Profile at Enciclopediadelcalcio.it

1923 births
2003 deaths
A.S. Roma players
Association football midfielders
Empoli F.C. players
Italian footballers
A.C.N. Siena 1904 players
Serie A players
S.S.D. Lucchese 1905 players
S.S.D. Pro Sesto players
Taranto F.C. 1927 players
U.S. Salernitana 1919 players